Wayne Harold Page (September 25, 1922 – March 26, 2001) was a Vermont military officer and business executive who served as Adjutant General of the Vermont National Guard.

Early life
Wayne H. Page was born in Hyde Park, Vermont on September 25, 1922.  He was educated in Hyde Park, and graduated from the University of Vermont with a degree in electrical engineering in 1943.

World War II
Page joined the United States Army for World War II, enlisting in 1943 and receiving his commission after completion of Officer Candidate School in 1944. He served in Europe as a member of the 398th Infantry Regiment, 100th Infantry Division and attained the rank of captain before being discharged in 1946.

Post-World War II
After the war, Page became a mining engineer, manager and executive with the Ruberoid Corporation, responsible for overseeing operations at an asbestos mine in Belvidere, Vermont.

He was also active in politics, including serving as Chairman of the Lamoille County Republican Committee.

He also maintained his affiliation with the military as a member of the Vermont Army National Guard.

He was activated for the Korean War as a member of the 43rd Division, but was released before the division deployed to West Germany, acceding to a Department of Defense request to return to his civilian job, which was regarded as more important to the war effort.

By the mid-1960s, Page had attained the rank of brigadier general as commander of the 86th Armored Brigade and then Vermont's Assistant Adjutant General for Army.

Adjutant General
In September, 1966 Adjutant General Francis William Billado died. From September until December of that year his deputy, Reginald M. Cram acted as Adjutant General.

In November, Page announced that he would be a candidate for the position during the election scheduled for February, 1967.  (Since the 1860s the Adjutant General is selected for a two-year term by the Vermont General Assembly. Elections are held in February of each odd-numbered year, and terms begin the following March. The Governor of Vermont can make a temporary appointment to fill a vacancy if it occurs when the legislature is not in session.)

On November 30, 1966, Governor Philip H. Hoff appointed Page to serve as Adjutant General until the new term began in March, 1967. Though both Cram and Page were Republicans and Hoff a Democrat, Hoff indicated that he made the decision to appoint Page after other Vermont National Guard officers expressed to him their preference for an Army officer (Page) over one from the Air Force (Cram), given that most Vermont National Guard units were Army organizations.

After Page's appointment, Cram resigned as Deputy Adjutant General and campaigned for a full two-year term.  In an upset, Cram defeated Page in the election, ending Page's three-month tenure as Adjutant General.  (Cram served until he retired in 1981.)

Page served again briefly as Assistant Adjutant General for Army after losing the election, and retired from the military in mid-1967.  He continued his career with the Ruberoid Corporation, which later became part of GAF Materials Corporation, accepting positions outside Vermont and rising to Vice President and member of the board of directors.

Retirement and death
Page continued to live in Lamoille County after retiring in the late 1980s. He was a member of the Veterans of Foreign Wars, the American Legion, and numerous other civic, professional and fraternal organizations. In addition, he was an active volunteer at Morristown's Centennial Library.
He died in Burlington, Vermont on March 26, 2001, and was buried in Hyde Park's Hooper Cemetery.

Awards
Page's awards included the Bronze Star Medal (2) and the Combat Infantryman Badge.

Family
In 1942 Page married Sylvia F. Ward (March 22, 1923 – June 25, 1999).  They had three children: Chandler S. who died in 1963, Karen Hoke of Allentown, Pennsylvania and Nancy Zaphiris of Arlington, Massachusetts.

References

External links
, retrieved December 30, 2013

1922 births
2001 deaths
United States Army generals
National Guard (United States) generals
United States Army personnel of World War II
United States Army personnel of the Korean War
American mining engineers
Vermont Republicans
University of Vermont alumni
People from Hyde Park, Vermont
Burials in Vermont
Vermont National Guard personnel
20th-century American engineers